"When Love Takes Over You" is a song by American singer and songwriter Donna Summer, released on November 13, 1989 by Warner Bros. Records (Europe) as the fifth and final single from her fourteenth album, Another Place and Time (1989). Like the rest of the album, the song was written and produced by British production team Stock Aitken & Waterman. Not released in America, the song just managed to enter the UK Singles Chart at number 72, having been remixed for its release as a single.

Critical reception
Taylor Dayne reviewed the song for Number One, saying, "She's got a brilliant voice, there's so much character in her singing that it's unmistakable." In an retrospective review, Pop Rescue considered "When Love Takes Over You" as "far more mellow and less catchy" than "I Don't Wanna Get Hurt", the previous track on the album, and remarked that "[Summer]'s vocals are softer, and it's musically more gentle too, with pianos, and a slower beat".

Track listing
 7"
 "When Love Takes Over You (Remix)" – 3:37 	
 "Bad Reputation" – 4:08

 UK 12"/UK 3inch CDS
 "When Love Takes Over You (Extended Remix)" – 6:14 	
 "When Love Takes Over You (Instrumental)" – 3:37 	
 "Bad Reputation" – 4:08

Charts

References

Donna Summer songs
1989 songs
Song recordings produced by Stock Aitken Waterman
Songs written by Mike Stock (musician)
Songs written by Matt Aitken
Songs written by Pete Waterman
Dance-pop songs
Warner Records singles
1989 singles